The following is a list of accolades and honors conferred upon the sixth chancellor of the Federal Republic of Germany, Helmut Kohl.

Honorary degrees and citizenships

 – Given on 9 November 1992, the third anniversary of the fall of the Berlin Wall to Kohl, Ronald Reagan and Mikhail Gorbachev.
 – Received on 11 December 1998 at the Hofburg Palace, Vienna. The only other honorary citizenship of Europe was given to Jean Monnet in 1976.

Accolades

Namesakes 
 In 1995, the Institute of European Studies at the Hebrew University of Jerusalem, founded in 1991, was renamed Helmut Kohl Institute in his honor.
 Two streets in Germany bear his name, the Doktor-Helmut-Kohl-Straße in Loddin on Usedom and the Helmut-Kohl-Weg between the German city of Eppenbrunn and the French town of Roppeviller.

References

Helmut Kohl
Kohl, Helmut